= Second Row =

Second Row may refer to:

- Second Row (rugby union), a name for the two lock positions in rugby union
- Second Row (rugby league), a name for the two second-row forward positions in rugby league
